Tuc de Molières is a mountain located in Catalonia, Spain. Located in the Pyrenees, it has an elevation of 3,011 metres above sea level.

References

Mountains of Aragon
Mountains of Catalonia
Mountains of the Pyrenees